is a mixed Japanese artist based in New York City and London.

She is known for her abstracted figurative paintings that explore human fragility, vulnerability, intimacy, and her mixed heritages of Japan, Hong Kong, and Italy. She speaks 6 languages, and had solo exhibited 8 international shows, and more than 15 international group shows by 22 years old.

Early life and education 
Nishiyama graduated from Parsons School of Design with a Bachelors of Fine Arts, and Central Saint Martins with a Masters of Fine Arts degree. She also attended Canadian International School of Hong Kong.

Solo Exhibitions 
2022 - The Beautiful and The Grotesque, Haus of Contemporary, Hong Kong

2022 - Seiza: Transgressing the Seated Body, Art Next, Hong Kong

2021 - Moroi, Shout Gallery, Hong Kong

2021 - Ikebana, International Finance Centre, Hong Kong

2021 - Mizuki Nishiyama, Mr Wolf, Hong Kong

2020 - Shunga, Whitestone Gallery, Hong Kong

2020 - Mizuki Nishiyama, Operation Smile Charity Art Auction, Hong Kong

2020 - An Exploration of Human Fragility : Love and Lust, Tenri Cultural Institute of New York, New York, NY

2019 - Mizuki Nishiyama: 脆い: An Exploration of Human Fragility, The Greenpoint Gallery, New York, NY

2018 - Mizuki Nishiyama, Rabbit House, New York, NY

References

1998 births
Artists from New York City
Japanese women painters
21st-century Japanese painters
Japanese expatriates in the United States
Japanese people of Chinese descent
Japanese people of Italian descent
Parsons School of Design alumni
Living people